Constance Ann Shulman (born April 4, 1958) is an American actress. She is best known for voicing Patti Mayonnaise on Doug and for her recurring role as Yoga Jones in Orange Is the New Black. Shulman originated the role of Annelle in the first production of Steel Magnolias Off-Broadway.

Life and career
Shulman was born in Johnson City, Tennessee, to a Jewish family. In 1980, she graduated from the University of Tennessee with a bachelor's degree in both speech and theater. She moved to New York City to study acting at the Circle in the Square Theatre School and pursue an acting career. In 1989, she made her screen debut in the comedy film Fletch Lives, playing Cindy Mae. She later had supporting parts in films Lost Angels, Men Don't Leave, and Fried Green Tomatoes.

On television, Shulman worked as a voice actress, playing Patti Mayonnaise on Doug from 1991 to 1999. In the early 1990s, Shulman appeared in a series of Kraft mayonnaise commercials.

She was also a regular cast member in the short-lived 1996 ABC sitcom, The Faculty, playing the best friend of Meredith Baxter's character. In the late 1990s Shulman left the screen to raise her two children.

In 2013, Shulman was cast in a recurring role as "Yoga Jones" in the Netflix comedy-drama series, Orange Is the New Black. Along with the rest of the cast, she received a Screen Actors Guild Award for Outstanding Performance by an Ensemble in a Comedy Series in 2015.

Personal life
She is married to fellow actor Reed Birney, and their daughter Gus Birney is an actress.

Filmography

Film

Television

References

External links
 

1958 births
20th-century American actresses
21st-century American actresses
Actresses from Tennessee
Actresses from Los Angeles
American film actresses
American television actresses
American voice actresses
Circle in the Square Theatre School alumni
Living people
Jewish American actresses
People from Johnson City, Tennessee
University of Tennessee alumni
21st-century American Jews